Zophar may refer to:
Tzofar, a moshav in southern Israel
Zophar, a man mentioned in the Book of Job
Zophar (Lunar series), a video game villain from the game Lunar:  Eternal Blue 
Zophar's Domain, a website for emulation news and downloads